Lobo is a village (kampung) in Kaimana district, Kaimana Regency, West Papua, Indonesia, off the coast of Bay of Kaimana. The settlement was established in 1828 by the Dutch. They established the Fort Du Bus at Lobo with the official opening on August 24, 1828.

References

Populated places in West Papua
Populated places established in 1828